Kamaruddheen is the tallest known man alive in Kerala who stands at 7 ft 2 in (2.184 m). Aged 57, he is a native of Guruvayoor, Kerala and is a senior member of the Kerala Tall Men Association. He has also acted in films, most notably as one of the cannibalistic giants in the Vinayan film Athbhutha Dweepu.

Filmography
 Athbhutha Dweepu (2005)

References

External links
 Kerala Tall Men Association
Kerala Tall Men Association
  http://tallmen.in/

Living people
People from Guruvayur
Male actors in Malayalam cinema
Indian male film actors
21st-century Indian male actors
Male actors from Kerala
Year of birth missing (living people)